Kowiesy may refer to the following places:
Kowiesy, Łódź Voivodeship (central Poland)
Kowiesy, Sokołów County in Masovian Voivodeship (east-central Poland)
Kowiesy, Żyrardów County in Masovian Voivodeship (east-central Poland)